Andreyev Pochinok is a rural locality (a village) in Ustyansky District, Arkhangelsk Oblast, Russia. The population was 4 as of 2010.

Geography 
It is located on the Veryuga River, 100 km from Oktyabrsky..

References 

Rural localities in Ustyansky District